Hermann Vogel refers to:
Hermann Wilhelm Vogel (1834–1898), photochemist
Hermann Carl Vogel (1841–1907), astronomer
Hermann Vogel (German illustrator) (1854–1921)
Hermann Vogel (French illustrator) (1856–1918)